Porcia may refer to:

Porcia gens, ancient Roman family
Porcia (wife of Brutus)
Porcia (sister of Cato the Younger)
Valerian and Porcian laws, Roman laws
Porcia, Friuli-Venezia Giulia, a municipality in Italy
Schloss Porcia, a castle in Spittal an der Drau, Austria

See also
Porcius (disambiguation)
Portia (disambiguation)
Porsche